Ulrico Kostner (born 31 January 1946) is a retired Italian cross-country skier. He competed at the 1972 and 1976 Olympics in the 30 km, 50 km and 4×10 km relay with the best achievement of seventh place in the relay in 1976.

References

1946 births
Living people
People from Urtijëi
Cross-country skiers at the 1972 Winter Olympics
Cross-country skiers at the 1976 Winter Olympics
Olympic cross-country skiers of Italy
Italian male cross-country skiers
Ladin people
Cross-country skiers of Centro Sportivo Carabinieri
Sportspeople from Südtirol